Martti is a Finnish and Estonian masculine given name. The name is the Finnish equivalent of the Latin name Martinus and originally refers to Mars, the god of war. It is a cognate of the name Martin. As of 1 January 2023, 531 men in Estonia have the first name Martti, making it the 275th most popular male name in the country.

Individuals named Martti include:
Martti Aho (1896–1968), Finnish military colonel
Martti Ahtisaari (born 1937), Finnish politician; tenth President of Finland 
Martti Aiha (born 1952), Finnish sculptor 
Martti Aljand (born 1987), Estonian swimmer
Martti Haavio (1899–1973), Finnish poet, folklorist and mythologist
Martti Häikiö (born 1949), Finnish historian and writer
Martti Halme (born 1943), Finnish footballer
Martti Haukioja (born 1999), Finnish footballer
Martti Helde (born 1987), Estonian film director and screenwriter
Martti Huhtala (1918–2005), Finnish Nordic combined skier
Martti Hyvärinen (born 1939), Finnish footballer
Martti Ingman (1907–1989), Finnish diplomat
Martti Jarkko (born 1953), Finnish ice hockey player
Martti Järventaus (born 1960), Finnish swimmer
Martti Järventie (born 1976), Finnish ice hockey player
Martti Järvinen (born 1933), Finnish footballer
Martti Juhkami (born 1988), Estonian volleyball player
Martti Jukola (1900–1952), Finnish hurdler and sports journalist 
Martti Jylhä (born 1987), Finnish cross-country skier
Martti Katajisto (1926–2000), Finnish actor
Martti Keel (born 1992), Estonian volleyball player
Martti Kellokumpu (born 1963), Finnish freestyle skier
Martti Ketelä (1944–2002), Finnish modern pentathlete
Martti Kiilholma (born 1950), Finnish long-distance runner
Martti Korhonen (born 1953), Finnish politician
Martti Korkia-Aho (1930–2012), Finnish businessman and politician 
Martti Koskenniemi (born 1953), Finnish international lawyer and diplomat
Martti Kosma (1922–1999), Finnish footballer and manager
Martti Kuoppa (born 1978), Finnish BMX rider
Martti Kuusela (born 1945), Finnish footballer and manager
Martti Kykkling (1857–1917), Finnish politician 
Martti Laakso (born 1943), Finnish wrestler
Martti Laitinen (1929–2017), Finnish footballer
Martti Lappalainen (1902–1941), Finnish cross-country skier and biathlete
Martti Larni (1909–1993), Finnish writer
Martti Lauronen (1913–1987), Finnish cross-country skier 
Martti Lautala (1928–2016), Finnish cross-country skier
Martti Maatela (1935–2013), Finnish Nordic combined skier
Martti Mansikka (born 1933), Finnish gymnast
Martti Matilainen (1907–1993), Finnish steeplechase and middle-distance runner 
Martti Marttelin (1897–1940), Finnish long-distance runner 
Martti Meinilä (1927–2005), Finnish biathlete
Martti Mertanen (1925–2001), Finnish painter
Martti Miettunen (1907–2002), Finnish politician; former Prime Minister of Finland
Martti Mölsä (born 1952),  Finnish politician
Martti "Masa" Niemi (1914–1960), Finnish actor
Martti Nieminen (1891–1941), Finnish wrestler
Martti Nissinen (born 1959), Finnish theologian
Martti Nõmme (born 1993), Estonian ski jumper
Martti Peltonen (1901–1973), Finnish politician
Martti Peltoniemi (1935–1975), Finnish wrestler
Martti Pennanen (1923–2010), Finnish actor
Martti Pihkala (1906–1966), Finnish politician
Martti Pesonen (born 1942), Finnish motorcycle road racer
Martti Pokela (1924–2007), Finnish folk musician and composer
Martti Räsänen (1893–1976), Finnish linguist and turkologist 
Martti Rautanen (1845–1926), Finnish missionary
Martti Rautio (1935–2017), Finnish-Canadian cross-country skier
Martti Rosenblatt (born 1987), Estonian volleyball player
Martti Rousi (born 1960), Finnish cellist
Martti Saarinen (born 1980), Finnish singer
Martti Saario (1906–1988), Finnish organizational theorist and academic
Martti Salomies (1923–1987), Finnish diplomat and ambassador
Martti Olavi Siirala (1922–2008), Finnish psychiatrist, psychoanalyst and philosopher
Martti Simojoki (1908–1999), Finnish Archbishop of Turku
Martti Sipilä (1915–2003), Finnish cross-country skier
Martti Soosaar (1933–2017), Estonian journalist and writer
Martti Suntela (1903–1999),  Finnish agronomist and politician
Martti Suosalo (born 1962), Finnish actor and singer
Martti Talja (born 1951), Finnish politician
Martti Talvela (1935–1989), Finnish operatic bass
Martti Tolamo (1907–1940), Finnish decathlete, long jumper and pentathlete
Martti Uosikkinen (1909–1940), Finnish gymnast 
Martti Välikangas (1893–1973), Finnish architect 
Martti Välimaa (born 1989), Finnish footballer
Martti Wallén (born 1948), Finnish operatic bass 
Kurt Martti Wallenius (1893–1984), Finnish military major general

References

Estonian masculine given names
Finnish masculine given names